Khordad Sal is the birth anniversary (or birthdate) of Zarathushtra. Zoroastrians all over the world, especially the Parsis of India, celebrate the day in a great glamor. Parties and ghambars are held. Special prayers and jashan are also held throughout the entire day. Clean, rangoli-strewn homes, children with vermilion spots on their foreheads, new clothes, fragrant flowers and delicious meals, all form part of the rituals. A grand feast is prepared to mark the occasion.

Since the Parsi community is especially tight-knit, its celebrations bring kith and kin together; so does Khordad Sal. The festival is also an opportunity for the Parsis to review their lives and actions, and make resolutions for the future.

See also
 Twin Holy Birthdays

Zoroastrian festivals